The Ivan Vazov National Library is a library situated in Bulgaria's second largest city, Plovdiv. It is named after the famous Bulgarian writer and poet Ivan Vazov.

It is the nation's second largest library containing more than 1,500,000 books. The library is also Bulgaria's second oldest, founded in 1879. In 1974 it was moved to a new edifice to the south of the City Garden. The library boasts 134 employees including 90 high-qualified specialists and research scholars.

External links 
Ivan Vazov National Library - Official site

1879 establishments in Bulgaria
Library buildings completed in 1974
Buildings and structures in Plovdiv
Tourist attractions in Plovdiv
Government of Bulgaria
Libraries in Bulgaria
Bulgaria
Education in Plovdiv
Culture in Plovdiv
Libraries established in 1879